Vitaly Dmitriyevich Kurdchenko (born 23 September 1940) is a retired Russian rower who had his best achievements in the coxed fours, partnering with Vladimir Yevseyev, Anatoly Tkachuk, Boris Kuzmin and Anatoly Luzgin. In this event, they won two European titles and a silver medal at the 1966 World Rowing Championships; they finished in fifth place at the 1964 Summer Olympics. Kurdchenko also competed in the coxed eights and won a European silver in 1969.

References

1940 births
Living people
Olympic rowers of the Soviet Union
Rowers at the 1964 Summer Olympics
Soviet male rowers
Russian male rowers
World Rowing Championships medalists for the Soviet Union
European Rowing Championships medalists